The LYNX rail system in Charlotte, North Carolina, US comprises 43 stations on two lines, the Blue Line and the Gold Line. The Blue Line is a light rail line connecting Uptown Charlotte to Pineville and the University of North Carolina Charlotte campus. The Gold Line is a streetcar line within Uptown Charlotte.

Stations

References

 
Ly
LYNX